Howlin' is the debut album by Australian dance-rock band Jagwar Ma. It was released in June 2013 under Mom + Pop Music in the United States, Marathon in the United Kingdom and Europe, and Future Classic in Australia and New Zealand.

At the J Awards of 2013, the album was nominated for Australian Album of the Year.

The album was written and performed by band members Jono Ma and Gabriel Winterfield, and recorded and produced by Ma. It was mixed primarily by Ewan Pearson with additional mixes by Ma, Anthony Garvin and Steve Dub.

Track listing

Charts

References

2013 albums
Jagwar Ma albums
Mom + Pop Music albums